Caledasthena is a monotypic moth genus in the family Geometridae. Its single species, Caledasthena montana, is found in New Caledonia in the south-west Pacific Ocean. Both the genus and species were first described by Jeremy Daniel Holloway in 1979.

References

Larentiinae
Monotypic moth genera